Gower is the name of one of the electoral wards of town of Llanrwst, Conwy County Borough, Wales. It covers the northern part of the town, with its western border defined by the River Conwy and its southern border (dividing it from Llanrwst's Crwst ward) defined by the Nant y Fedwen.

According to the 2011 UK Census the population of the ward was 1,205.

County council elections
The ward elects a county councillor to Conwy County Borough Council and, at the May 2017 election, the seat was won by Robert Jenkins for Plaid Cymru. It has been represented continuously by Plaid Cymru since 1995.

Gower ward became newsworthy in June 2004 when the sitting councillor, 74 year old Dafydd Parry Jones, collapsed and died while out campaigning in the county council election. Cllr Jones had been Gower's representative since 1996 and had been chair of the county council in 1998 and leader of the council's Plaid Cymru group. The election in the ward was subsequently postponed to 22 July.

See also
 List of places in Conwy County Borough (categorised)

References

Llanrwst
Wards of Conwy County Borough